Boesen is a surname. Notable people with the surname include:

Anders Boesen (born 1976), Danish badminton player
Andreas Boesen (born 1991), Danish orienteer
Lasse Boesen (born 1979), Danish team handball player
Thecla Boesen (1910–1996), Danish film actress